The 1915–16 Army Cadets men's basketball team represented United States Military Academy during the 1915–16 college men's basketball season. The head coach was Jacob Devers, coaching his second season with the Cadets. The team captain was Louis Hibbs.

Schedule

|-

References

Army Black Knights men's basketball seasons
Army
Army Cadets Men's Basketball Team
Army Cadets Men's Basketball Team